Cephaloon tenuicorne is a species of false longhorn beetle in the family Stenotrachelidae. It is found in North America.

References

Further reading

 
 

Tenebrionoidea
Articles created by Qbugbot
Beetles described in 1874